Amuropaludina praerosa is a species of freshwater snail with a gill and an operculum, an aquatic gastropod mollusk in the family Viviparidae.

Amuropaludina praerosa is the type species of the genus Amuropaludina.

Distribution 
This species is found in the Amur River basin, in Russia. The type locality is the middle Amur River.

Major threats include river pollution.

References

External links 

Viviparidae